Banmian or pan mee is a popular Chinese noodle dish, consisting of handmade noodles served in soup. Other types of handmade noodles include youmian (similar dough texture and taste, but thinner round noodles), or mee hoon kueh (flat and thin rectangular pieces).

The name banmian (board/block noodle) came from the Hakka method of cutting the noodle into straight strands using a wooden block as ruler. In Hak, some might call it Man-Foon-Char-Guo or Dao-Ma-Chet.

In Hokkien, it was called Mee-Hoon-Kueh (麵粉粿; lit. "wheat snack") but what can be found at hawker stalls is generally called banmian. The current style is a mix between the traditional methods of Hakka and Hokkien. The Hakka initially made the noodle by shaving pieces off a block of dough, commonly made from flour (sometimes egg is added for more flavor), while the Hokkien would roll the dough into a large, flat piece that would then be torn by hand into bite-sized bits. Traditionally, the dough is hand-kneaded and torn into smaller pieces of dough (about 2 inches). The dough can also be kneaded using the machine into a variety of shapes, the most common shape being flat strips of noodle.

Banmian is a culinary dish that is popular in China, Malaysia, Singapore and Taiwan. It consists of egg noodles served in a flavorful soup, often with some type of meat or fish, vegetables and various spices. Dried anchovies, minced pork, mushrooms, and a leafy vegetable such as sweet potato leaves or sayur manis (sauropus androgynus) are also possible ingredients.

The meal is considered one of the healthier food choices and can be found for sale by restaurants, street vendors and food stalls in the region. The base of the entire meal is the soup, so there are numerous variations in ingredients, stocks and noodle shapes. In many instances, the completed soup is topped with an egg that is cooked in the hot liquid above the noodles.

Traditional versions of banmian use egg noodles that are simply a blend of egg, flour, water and salt that is kneaded and then formed into noodles. However, the modern day banmian is mainly made by using a pasta maker which cuts noodles in all sizes.

The base of the soup can be water, but is more commonly a type of fish stock. Normal fish stock can be used, but anchovy stock is a common choice. Various ingredients, such as onions, garlic, ginger and bean paste, also can be added to the stock to provide more flavor, although some preparations are so simple that nothing more than plain stock is used. In Malaysia, dry noodles and soup are served separately.

Dry chilli pan mee is a variant which was invented in Chow Kit, Kuala Lumpur, and is very popular in the Klang Valley. This dry noodle is served with minced pork, fried onions, anchovies, and topped with a poached egg which is later to be stirred into the noodles. It is usually served with dry chilli or sambal.

Two common ingredients that are often found across different versions of banmian are mushrooms and anchovies. The exact type of each might vary, but they are generally added to the stock base. The mushrooms can be dried and are reconstituted in the broth, while the anchovies could be fried until crispy and then served on top of the soup. The anchovies also can be added to the stock for flavor and allowed to break down as it cooks.

Once the base stock is completed, nearly anything can be added to complete the banmian. This includes vegetables such as green onions, spinach, cabbage and bamboo shoots. Some vinegar is usually added, occasionally with sugar, to balance the flavor. Restaurants may offer minced pork that has been fried or chunks of white fish to act as a protein-rich addition to the soup. Finally, an egg is cracked into the hot broth and allowed to cook until the whites are set, and the yolk is warmed through.

See also

 Chinese noodles
 List of Chinese soups
 List of soups

References

Anchovy dishes
Chinese noodle dishes
Chinese soups
Hakka cuisine
Hakka culture in Singapore
Indonesian noodle dishes
Malaysian noodle dishes
Noodle soups
Singaporean noodle dishes